"Erythrobacter tepidarius" is a moderately thermophilic and non-motile bacteria from the genus of Erythrobacter which has been isolated from a hot spring in Usami in Japan.

References

Further reading

External links
Type strain of Porphyrobacter tepidarius at BacDive -  the Bacterial Diversity Metadatabase	

Sphingomonadales
Bacteria described in 1997
Thermophiles